Shawtown is an unincorporated community in Hancock County, in the U.S. state of Ohio.

History
Shawtown was laid out in 1882 when the New York, Chicago and St. Louis Railroad was extended to that point. A post office was established at Shawtown in 1881, and remained in operation until 1923.

References

Unincorporated communities in Hancock County, Ohio
Unincorporated communities in Ohio